The 2015 McDonald's All-American Boys Game is an All-star basketball game that was played on April 1, 2015, at the United Center in Chicago, home of the Chicago Bulls. It was the 38th annual McDonald's All-American Game for high school boys. The game's rosters features the best and most highly recruited blue chip boys high school basketball players graduating in 2015.  Chicago, which became the first city to host the game in back-to-back years in 2012, continues to host the game annually for the fifth consecutive time. When the rosters for the game were announced on January 28, 15 of the 24 players had committed to Division I basketball programs; Duke and LSU led the field with two commits each.

On March 10, 2015, Ben Simmons was named the Morgan Wootten Award winner, regarded as the McDonald's All-American national player of the year award. In the game, the East team—led by MVP Cheick Diallo's 18 points and 10 rebounds—defeated the West team by a 111–91 margin. In the associated Jam Fest, Dwayne Bacon, Luke Kennard and Jalen Brunson won the slam dunk contest, three-point shooting contest and skills competition, respectively.

Rosters

At the time of the roster announcement the 24 players included 22 of the top 25 players according to the 2015 ESPN 100. The two highest rated players (Ben Simmons and Jaylen Brown) were both named to the East team. The West team roster was highlighted by Malik Newman. Based on ratings at ESPN.com, the highest rated eligible player not invited was number 18 ranked Texas A&M signee Tyler Davis.  However, according to 247Sports.com's composite ranking, the highest rated non-invitee was 15th-ranked Arizona signee Ray Smith. Nine uncommitted players at the time of the roster announcement was regarded as a high total and was higher than the total of two the year before. Kentucky signee Skal Labissière (number 3 at ESPN and number 5 at 247Sports.com) was not eligible due to his athletic ineligibility after transferring. As of gametime, 8 players remained undecided on their college affiliations. 5 of the players were scheduled to begin play in the Dick's Sporting Goods High School Nationals the following day.

On March 10, 2015, Simmons was named the Morgan Wootten Award winner, given annually to the best male McDonald's All-American player who exemplifies outstanding character, exhibits leadership and embodies the values of being a student-athlete in the classroom and in the community. In doing so, he joined Austin Rivers (2011) as the only Florida high schoolers to win the award. In the week prior to the game Diamond Stone committed to Maryland. Also, Jaylen Brown made news that week for a stop sign violation, but his participation in the game was not in jeopardy. Henry Ellenson endured a broken hand on March 20 in the Wisconsin Interscholastic Athletic Association Division 2 semifinals, and he did not play in the McDonald's All-American game.

The POWERADE Jam Fest was held at the Gerald Ratner Center of the University of Chicago on March 30. The slam dunk contest included Kristine Anigwe, who was attempting to become the first girl to win the dunk contest since Candace Parker won the 2004 contest. Dwayne Bacon won the dunk contest against finalist Stephen Zimmerman with dunks that included a dunk over Jalen Rose who stood in front of the basket, while Anigwe failed to complete a dunk. Luke Kennard won the boys three-point shooting contest over finalists Jalen Brunson and Antonio Blakeney. Brunson won the boys Skills Competition over finalists Carlton Bragg Jr. and Isaiah Briscoe.

Following the game, Thomas Bryant committed to Indiana on April 4. On April 10, Caleb Swanigan committed to Michigan State (joining Davis). Ivan Rabb committed to California on April 13. Zimmerman committed to UNLV on April 16. Newman committed to Mississippi State on April 24. North Carolina native, Brandon Ingram, who had risen to #3 overall in the ESPN 100 prior to his announcement, selected Duke (joining Kennard and Jeter) on April 27. The following day, Diallo committed to Kansas (joining Bragg). Jaylen Brown committed to California (joining Rabb) on May 1. On May 7, Swaningan decommitted from Michigan State. Then on May 19, he committed to Purdue.

East Roster
Dwayne Bacon (No. 20 in the ESPN 100, Florida State)
Antonio Blakeney (No. 14, LSU)
Isaiah Briscoe (No. 13, Kentucky)
Jaylen Brown (No. 2, California)^
Thomas Bryant (No. 22, Indiana)^
Cheick Diallo (No. 11, Kansas)^
Henry Ellenson (No. 5, Marquette)
Jawun Evans (No. 36, Oklahoma State)
Luke Kennard (No. 23, Duke)
Dedric Lawson (No. 26, Memphis)
Ben Simmons (No. 1, LSU)
Diamond Stone (No. 7, Maryland)^
^player was uncommitted when the team was announced

West Roster
Carlton Bragg Jr. (No. 21, Kansas)
Jalen Brunson (No. 17, Villanova)
Deyonta Davis (No. 16, Michigan State)
PJ Dozier (No. 25, South Carolina)
Brandon Ingram (No. 12, Duke)^
Chase Jeter (No. 9, Duke)
Malik Newman (No. 4, Mississippi State)^
Ivan Rabb (No. 6, California)^
Malachi Richardson (No. 19, Syracuse)
Caleb Swanigan (No. 8, Purdue)^
Allonzo Trier (No. 15, Arizona)
Stephen Zimmerman (No. 10, UNLV)^
^player was uncommitted when the team was announced

Bruce Kelley of the Bullis School in Potomac, Maryland coached the East team, while Robert Smith of Chicago's Simeon Career Academy coached the West team.

Results
The East defeated the West by a 111–91 score. Cheick Diallo earned MVP of the game after posting 18 points and 10 rebounds, for the East team. Five East team players (Diallo, Antonio Blakeney, Diamond Stone, Dwayne Bacon, and Isaiah Briscoe) and four West team players (Allonzo Trier, Brandon Ingram, PJ Dozier, and Ivan Rabb) reached double figures in scoring.

Notes

External links
McDonald's All-American on the web
roster on ESPN

2014–15 in American basketball
2015
2010s in Chicago
2015 in Illinois
2015 in sports in Illinois
Basketball in Illinois